Alejandro Núñez (born 25 February 1984 in Madrid, Spain) is a Spanish racing driver who is currently competing in the Porsche Supercup, Spanish Formula 3 and, most recently, has signed with the Trident Racing team to compete in the International Formula Master series.. He is best known for competing in the World Series by Renault in 2007, driving for Red Devil Team Comtec.

Racing record

Complete Formula Renault 3.5 Series results
(key) (Races in bold indicate pole position) (Races in italics indicate fastest lap)

External links
 Alejandro Núñez career statistics at Driver Database

References

Spanish racing drivers
1984 births
Living people
Formula 3 Euro Series drivers
International Formula Master drivers
World Series Formula V8 3.5 drivers
Porsche Supercup drivers
Prema Powerteam drivers

De Villota Motorsport drivers
Comtec Racing drivers
Trident Racing drivers